Lee Greenwood (born 28 September 1980) is an English professional rugby league coach who is the head coach of the Dewsbury Rams in the Betfred Championship and an English former professional rugby league footballer who played in the 1990s, 2000s and 2010s.

Background
Lee Greenwood was born in Siddal, Halifax, West Yorkshire, England.

Playing career

International honours
Lee Greenwood won two caps for England while at London Broncos, he played , and scored 2-tries in the 98-4 victory over Russia in the 2004 European Nations Cup at Luzhniki Stadium, Moscow on 24 October 2004, and played  in the 36-12 victory over Ireland in the 2004 European Nations Cup Final at Halliwell Jones Stadium, Warrington on 7 November 2004.

References

External links
(archived by web.archive.org) Sheffield Eagles profile
(archived by web.archive.org) Halifax profile
(archived by web.archive.org) Leigh Centurions profile

1980 births
Living people
Batley Bulldogs players
Dewsbury Rams coaches
England national rugby league team players
English rugby league coaches
English rugby league players
Gloucestershire All Golds coaches
Halifax R.L.F.C. players
Huddersfield Giants players
Leigh Leopards players
London Broncos players
Oldham R.L.F.C. players
Rugby league centres
Rugby league players from Halifax, West Yorkshire
Rugby league wingers
Sheffield Eagles (1984) players